Frank Schwabe (born 12 November 1970) is a German politician of the Social Democratic Party (SPD) who has been serving as a member of the Bundestag from the state of North Rhine-Westphalia since 2005.

In addition to his parliamentary work, Schwabe has been serving as Commissioner for Global Freedom of Religion at the Federal Ministry for Economic Cooperation and Development in the government of Chancellor Olaf Scholz since 2022.

Political career 
Schwabe first became a member of the Bundestag after the 2005 German federal election, representing the Recklinghausen I district. 

In parliament, Schwabe first served on the Committee on Environment, Nature Conservation and Nuclear Safety from 2005 to 2021. He has been a member of the Committee on Human Rights and Humanitarian Aid (since 2014), the Committee on Foreign Affairs (since 2021) and the Subcommittee on International Climate and Energy Policy (since 2022). He has been serving as his parliamentary group's spokesperson on human rights and humanitarian aid. 

Within the SPD parliamentary group, Schwabe belongs to the Parliamentary Left, a left-wing movement.

In addition to his committee assignments, Schwabe has been a member of the German delegation to the Parliamentary Assembly of the Council of Europe (PACE) since 2014. In the Assembly, he serves on the Committee on Political Affairs and Democracy; the Committee on the Honouring of Obligations and Commitments by the Member States of the Council of Europe (Monitoring Committee); the Committee on Rules of Procedure, Immunities, and Institutional Affairs; the Committee on Legal Affairs and Human Rights; and the Committee on Migration, Refugees and Displaced Persons. In 2018, he was elected chairman of the Socialists, Democrats and Greens Group. Since 2010, he has also been serving as the Assembly's rapporteur on human rights and the rule of law in the North Caucasus.

In the negotiations to form a so-called traffic light coalition of the SPD, the Green Party and the Free Democrats (FDP) following the 2021 German elections, Schwabe was part of his party's delegation in the working group on migration and integration, co-chaired by Boris Pistorius, Luise Amtsberg and Joachim Stamp.

Other activities 
 German Institute for Human Rights (DIMR), Member of the Board of Trustees
 University of Hagen, Member of the Parliamentary Advisory Board (since 2018)
 German Federation for the Environment and Nature Conservation (BUND), Member
 IG BCE, Member
 FC Schalke 04, Member
 Brot für die Welt, Member of the Committee on Development and Humanitarian Aid (2014–2017)

References

External links 

  
 Bundestag biography 

1970 births
Living people
Members of the Bundestag for North Rhine-Westphalia
Members of the Bundestag 2021–2025
Members of the Bundestag 2017–2021
Members of the Bundestag 2013–2017
Members of the Bundestag 2009–2013
Members of the Bundestag 2005–2009
Members of the Bundestag for the Social Democratic Party of Germany
20th-century births